The Torch-Bearers is a 1922 stage play by George Kelly about a housewife who becomes an actress (the original actress became a widow and withdrew) while her husband is away on business, with Act I being the rehearsal at their home, Act II is the show, and Act III is afterwards. The play is in the style of, as is the play within the play, of the Little Theatre Movement.

Production history 
It premiered originally in New Jersey at the Savoy Theatre in Asbury Park, directed by Kelly, starring Arthur Shaw (Frederick Ritter), Douglas Garden (Huxley Hossefrosse), Edward Reese (Mr. Spindler), Booth Howard (Ralph Twiller), William Castle (Teddy Spearing), J.A. Curtis (Stage Manager), Mary Boland (Paula Ritter), Alison Skipworth (J. Duro Pampinelli), Helen Lowell (Nelly Fell), Rose Mary King (Florence McCrickett), Daisy Atherton (Clara Sheppard), and Mary Gildea (Jenny). The show would before transferring to Broadway and opening on August 29, 1922 at the 48th Street Theatre. According to the play and The Independent, it was staged at the Vanderbilt Theatre.

The show was revived in 2000 at the Greenwich House, directed by Dylan Baker, set design Michael Vaughn Sims, costumes design Jonathan Bixby and Gregory Gale, lighting design Mark Stanley, sound design Robert Murphy, hair design Darlene Dannenfelser, production supervision by Entolo, production stage manager John Handy and assistant stage manager Casey Bozeman. The show starred David Garrison (Frederick Ritter), Faith Prince (Paula Ritter), Marian Seldes (J. Duro Pampinelli), Judith Blazer (Florence McCrickett), Joan Copeland (Nelly Fell), Paul Mullins (Ralph Twiller), Don Mayo (Huxley Hossefrosse), Ralph Cole Jr. (Teddy Sperling), Susan Mansur (Jenny), Claire Beckman (Clara Sheppard), and Albert Macklin (Mr. Spindler).

It was revived in 2009 at the Williamstown Theatre Festival, again directed by Dylan Baker, set design David Korins, lighting design Rui Rita, costume design Ilona Somogyi, sound design Alex Neumann, original music Michael Garin. The show starred John Rubinstein (Fred Ritter), Becky Ann Baker (Paula Ritter), Jessica Hecht (Clara Sheppard), Katherine McGrath (Duro Pampinelli), Katie Finneran (Florence McCrickett), Andrea Martin (Nelly Fell), Edward Herrmann (Huxley Hossefrosse), Philip Goodwin (Ralph Twiler), Yusef Bulos (Mr. Spindler), James Waterston (Teddy Spearing), Lizbeth MacKay (Jenny), and John Doherty (Stage Manager)

Screen adaptations 
In 1935, William Conselman and Bartlett Cormack adapted The Torch-Bearers into  Doubting Thomas starring Will Rogers, Billie Burke, and Alison Skipworth. A 1939 movie Too Busy to Work (1939 film), starring Jed Prouty, Spring Byington, and Kenneth Howell.

References

External links
 The full text of The Torch-Bearers at the Project Gutenberg

 
 

1922 plays
American plays adapted into films
Broadway plays
Comedy plays